The 2015–16 Michigan Wolverines women's basketball team will represent University of Michigan during the 2015–16 NCAA Division I women's basketball season. The Wolverines, led by fourth year head coach Kim Barnes Arico, play their home games at the Crisler Center and were members of the Big Ten Conference. They finished the season 21–14, 9–9 in Big Ten play to finish in a tie for seventh place. They lost in the second round of the Big Ten women's tournament to Iowa. They were invited to the Women's National Invitation Tournament defeated Wright State, Bucknell and San Diego in the first, second and third rounds, Temple in the quarterfinals before losing to Florida Gulf Coast in the semifinals.

Roster

Schedule

|-
!colspan=9 style="background:#242961; color:#F7BE05;"| Exhibition

|-
!colspan=9 style="background:#242961; color:#F7BE05;"| Non-conference regular season

|-
!colspan=9 style="background:#242961; color:#F7BE05;"| Big Ten regular season

|-
!colspan=9 style="text-align: center; background:#242961"|Big Ten Women's Tournament

|-
!colspan=9 style="text-align: center; background:#242961"|WNIT

See also
 2015–16 Michigan Wolverines men's basketball team

References

Michigan
Michigan
Michigan
2016 Women's National Invitation Tournament participants
Michigan Wolverines women's basketball seasons